Limefield is a house standing to the north of Bollington, Cheshire, England.  It was built in about 1830 for Joseph Brook.  It is constructed in ashlar brown sandstone, and has a pyramidal roof of Welsh slate with a large stone central chimney.  Its plan is square, with an extension to the rear.  The house has two storeys, with a symmetrical three-bay front.  It is recorded in the National Heritage List for England as a designated Grade II listed building.  Its stables and coach house are also listed at Grade II.

See also

Listed buildings in Bollington

References

Houses completed in 1830
Country houses in Cheshire
Grade II listed buildings in Cheshire
Grade II listed houses
1830 establishments in England